Lawrence Hargrave, MRAeS, (29 January 18506 July 1915) was a British-born Australian engineer, explorer, astronomer, inventor and aeronautical pioneer.

Biography 

Lawrence Hargrave was born in Greenwich, England, the second son of John Fletcher Hargrave (later Attorney-General of NSW), and was educated at Queen Elizabeth's Grammar School, Kirkby Lonsdale, Westmorland, where there is now a building named in his honour. He immigrated to Australia at fifteen years of age with his family, arriving in Sydney on 5 November 1865 on the La Hogue.  He accepted a place on the Ellesmere and circumnavigated Australia.  Although he had shown ability in mathematics at his English school he failed the matriculation examination and in 1867 took an engineering apprenticeship with the Australasian Steam Navigation Company in Sydney.  He later found the experience of great use in constructing his models and his theories.

In 1872, as an engineer, he sailed on the Maria on a voyage to New Guinea but the ship was wrecked. In 1875, he again sailed as an engineer on William John Macleay's expedition to the Gulf of Papua. From October 1875 to January 1876 he was exploring the hinterland of Port Moresby under Octavius Stone, and in April 1876 went on another expedition under Luigi D'Albertis for over 400 miles up the Fly River on the SS Ellengowan. In 1877 he was inspecting the newly developing pearling industry for Parbury Lamb and Co. He returned to Sydney, joined the Royal Society of New South Wales in 1877, and in 1878 became an assistant astronomical observer at Sydney Observatory. He held this position for about five years, retired in 1883 with a moderate competency, and gave the rest of his life to research work.

He was a Freemason.

Aeronautics 

Hargrave had been interested in experiments of all kinds from an early age, particularly those with aircraft. When his father died in 1885, and Hargrave came into his inheritance, he resigned from the observatory to concentrate on full-time research. and for a time gave particular attention to the flight of birds. He chose to live and experiment with his flying machines in Stanwell Park, a place which offers excellent wind and hang conditions and nowadays is the most famous hang gliding and paragliding venue in Australia.

In his career, Hargrave invented many devices, but never applied for a patent on any of them. He needed the money but he was a passionate believer in scientific communication as a key to furthering progress. As he wrote in 1893:

Workers must root out the idea [that] by keeping the results of their labours to themselves[,] a fortune will be assured to them. Patent fees are much wasted money. The flying machine of the future will not be born fully fledged and capable of a flight for 1000 miles or so. Like everything else it must be evolved gradually. The first difficulty is to get a thing that will fly at all. When this is made, a full description should be published as an aid to others. Excellence of design and workmanship will always defy competition.

Among many, three of Hargrave's inventions were particularly significant:
 study of curved aerofoils, particularly designs with a thicker leading edge;
 the box kite (1893), which greatly improved the lift to drag ratio of early gliders;
 work on the rotary engine, which powered many early flying machines up until about 1920.

He made endless experiments and numerous models, and communicated his conclusions in a series of papers to the Royal Society of New South Wales. Two papers which will be found in the 1885 volume of its Journal and Proceedings show that he was early on the road to success. Other important papers will be found in the 1893 and 1895 volumes which reported on his experiments with flying-machine motors and cellular kites.

Of great significance to those pioneers working toward powered flight, Hargrave successfully lifted himself off the ground under a train of four of his box kites at Stanwell Park Beach on 12 November 1894. Aided by James Swain, the caretaker at his property, the kite line was moored via a spring balance to two sandbags (see image). Hargrave carried an anemometer and clinometer aloft to measure wind speed and the angle of the kite line. He rose 16 feet in a wind speed of 21 mph. This experiment was widely reported and established the box kite as a stable aerial platform. Hargrave claimed that "The particular steps gained are the demonstration that an extremely simple apparatus can be made, carried about, and flown by one man; and that a safe means of making an ascent with a flying machine, of trying the same without any risk of accident, and descending, is now at the service of any experimenter who wishes to use it." This was seen by Abbott Lawrence Rotch of the meteorological observatory at Harvard University who constructed a kite from the particulars in Engineering. A modification was adopted by the weather bureau of the United States and the use of box-kites for meteorological observations became widespread. The principle was applied to gliders, and in October 1906 Alberto Santos-Dumont used the box-kite principle in his aeroplane to make his first flight. Until 1909 the box-kite aeroplane was the usual type in Europe.

Hargrave had not confined himself to the problem of constructing a heavier-than-air machine that would fly, for he had given much time to the means of propulsion. In 1889 he invented a rotary engine which appears to have attracted so little notice that its principle had to be discovered over again by the Seguin brothers in 1908. This form of engine was much used in early aviation until it was superseded by later inventions. His development of the rotary engine was frustrated by the weight of materials and quality of machining available at the time, and he was unable to get sufficient power from his engines to build an independent flying machine.

Hargrave's work inspired Alexander Graham Bell to begin his own experiments with a series of tetrahedral kite designs. However, Hargrave's work, like that of many other pioneers, was not sufficiently appreciated during his lifetime. His models were offered to the premier of New South Wales as a gift to the state, and it is generally incorrectly stated that the offer was not accepted. It is not clear what really happened, but there appears to have been delays in accepting the models, and in the meantime about 100 of them were given to some visiting German professors who handed them to the Deutsches Museum in Munich. Hargrave also conducted experiments with a hydroplane, the application of the gyroscopic principle to a "one-wheeled car", and with 'wave propelled vessels'.

Hargrave's only son Geoffrey was killed at the Battle of Gallipoli in May 1915 during World War I. Hargrave was operated on for appendicitis but suffered peritonitis afterwards and died in July 1915.  He was interred in Waverley Cemetery on the cliffs overlooking the open ocean.

Hargrave was an excellent experimenter and his models were well crafted.  He had the optimism that is essential for an inventor, and the perseverance that will not allow itself to be damped by failures.  Modest, unassuming and unselfish, he always refused to patent his inventions, and was only anxious that he might succeed in adding to the sum of human knowledge. Many men smiled at his efforts and few had faith that anything would come of them.  An honourable exception was Professor Richard Threlfall who, in his presidential address to the Royal Society of New South Wales in May 1895, spoke of his "strong conviction of the importance of the work which Mr Hargrave has done towards solving the problem of artificial flight". Threlfall called Hargrave the "inventor of human flight", and the debt supposed to be owed by the Wright brothers to Hargrave. The step he made in man's conquest of the air was an important one with far-reaching consequences, and he should be remembered as an important experimenter and inventor, who "probably did as much to bring about the accomplishment of dynamic flight as any other single individual".

Honors and memorials 

 An engraving of Lawrence Hargrave alongside some of his gliders appeared on the reverse of the Australian $20 banknote from 1966 to 1994.
 Hargrave has been the subject of two operas.  The first was Barry Conyngham's opera Fly which premiered in 1984 at the Victoria State Opera. The second was by Nigel Butterley with libretto by James McDonald, titled Lawrence Hargrave Flying Alone, which premiered at the Sydney Conservatorium of Music in 1988.
 There is a memorial stone cairn with dedication plaque at Bald Hill, overlooking the successful man lift site.
 Lawrence Hargrave Drive is a road which stretches from the Old Princes Highway in Helensburgh to the bottom of Bulli Pass in Thirroul.
 Lawrence Hargrave Reserve in Elizabeth Bay Road, Elizabeth Bay was named to commemorate Hargrave who lived nearby at 40 Roslyn Gardens from 1885 to 1893.
 A centenary celebration and re-enactment was held in November 1994 to commemorate the man lift at Stanwell Park beach.
 The Lawrence Hargrave Professor of Aeronautical Engineering at Sydney University and the Hargrave-Andrew Engineering and Sciences library at Monash University are named in his honour.
 Australia's largest airline Qantas named its fifth Airbus A380 aircraft (registration VH-OQE) after Lawrence Hargrave.
 A new technology building at his former school in Kirkby Lonsdale, England was named in his honour in 2017.
 A 1988 Lawrence Hargrave memorial sculpture, Winged Figure by Bert Flugelman, is located at the base of Mount Keira.
 A memorial plaque on Lawrence Hargrave's residence in Point Piper, Sydney Google Streetview Lawrence Hargrave memorial plaque

See also 
 Man-lifting kite

References 

Footnotes

Citations

Bibliography
 
 
 
 Michael Adams: "Wind Beneath his Wings: Lawrence Hargrave at Stanwell Park", Cultural Exchange International Pty. Ltd (2005)

External links 

 Hargrave's flying machines, blog post, State Library of New South Wales.
 Lawrence Hargrave, Australian aviation pioneer (1850–1915) (Monash University)
 Winged Figure Lawrence Hargrave Memorial
 The Hargrave Files papers and drawings by Lawrence Hargrave, and miscellaneous articles about Hargrave's kites from the archives of the Australian Kite Association

1850 births
1915 deaths
People from Greenwich
British aviation pioneers
Australian aerospace engineers
Structural engineers
British emigrants to Australia
19th-century Australian inventors
Deaths from peritonitis
Burials at Waverley Cemetery
Australian Freemasons
History of Wollongong
19th-century Australian scientists